Rudbar Sara may refer to:
 Rudbar Sara, Rezvanshahr
 Rudbar Sara, Siahkal
 Rudbar Sara, Talesh